The Amoy Operation, also known as the Battle of Xiamen was part of a campaign by Japan during the Second Sino-Japanese War to blockade China to prevent it from communicating with the outside world and importing needed arms and materials. Control of Amoy Island would provide a base to make the blockade of Fujian province more effective.

Like the Canton Operation, the Amoy Operation was overseen by Koichi Shiozawa (1881-1943), who was the commander-in-chief of the Fifth Fleet during the Second Sino-Japanese War (1937-1945). The fleets warships bombarded the city to cover the landing of more than 2,000 invading troops. The poorly equipped defenders of the city were forced to withdraw and move to Sung-yu. The blockade was successful so that China's ability to counterattack was effectively crippled.

References

Sources 
 Hsu Long-hsuen and Chang Ming-kai, History of The Sino-Japanese War (1937-1945) 2nd Ed., 1971. Translated by Wen Ha-hsiung, Chung Wu Publishing; 33, 140th Lane, Tung-hwa Street, Taipei, Taiwan Republic of China. Pg. 247,  Map 11.

External links
   Axis History Forum: OOB IJN Amphibious Assault Xiamen (Amoy) May 10, 1938

Second Sino-Japanese War
Battles of the Second Sino-Japanese War
Conflicts in 1938
1938 in China
1938 in Japan
Military history of Fujian
May 1938 events